Brad Ipson (born 17 September 1980) is an Australian cricketer. He played in nine List A and two Twenty20 matches for Queensland in 2011 and 2012.

See also
 List of Queensland first-class cricketers

References

External links
 

1980 births
Living people
Australian cricketers
Queensland cricketers
Place of birth missing (living people)